Christine Romans is a correspondent and anchor for CNN, and also an author.  She previously worked for Reuters and Knight Ridder Financial News.  She is the chief business correspondent for CNN, in addition anchors Early Start from 4 a.m. to 6 a.m. ET and the weekend business program "Your Money."

Early life and education
Romans is from Le Claire, Iowa. She graduated from Pleasant Valley High School in 1989 and went on to graduate from Iowa State University in 1993.  While attending Iowa State University Romans majored in French, journalism, and mass communication and studied French media and French literature at L'Instut Catholique de Lyon in France in the summer of 1991.

Career
Romans worked for a group of newspapers in the Midwest and was a reporter and anchor for Reuters Television. She joined CNN in 1999 and began reporting from the floor of the New York Stock Exchange. She was one of the hosts on CNN's On the Money and was a reporter and substitute anchor on Lou Dobbs Tonight. She also hosted Street Sweep on the defunct network CNNfn.

Romans' book Smart Is the New Rich: Money Guide for Millennials was published in the mid-2010s.

Personal life
She is married to Reuters editor Ed Tobin, and the couple have three children.

See also
 New Yorkers in journalism

References

External links
Christine Romans profile at CNN.com

CNN people
Iowa State University alumni
Living people
American women television journalists
Year of birth missing (living people)
21st-century American women